The Sevastopol Naval Base is a naval base located in Sevastopol, in the disputed Crimean peninsula. The base is used by the Russian Navy, and it is the main base of the Black Sea Fleet.

Geography 
The Sevastopol Naval Base is almost completely located within the administrative territory of Sevastopol. It has several berths located in several bays of Sevastopol – Severnaya, Yuzhnaya, Karantinnaya and others.

History 
The construction of the port started in 1772, while the Russo-Turkish War (1768–1774) was still ongoing, and was finished in 1783, following the annexation of Crimea by the Russian Empire. On 13 May 1783, the first eleven ships of the Imperial Russian Navy reached the Sevastopol Bay.

During the Crimean War (1853–1856), all large ships were scuttled in the entrance to the bay in 1854 to prevent the entry of enemy ships into the bay. The city defended itself for 349 days against the allied armies of France, United Kingdom, Ottoman Empire and Piedmont-Sardinia. Eventually, the Russians had to abandon Sevastopol on 9 September 1855.

During World War I, the Imperial German Army occupied Sevastopol on 1 May 1918 despite the ongoing negotiations to reach the Treaty of Brest-Litovsk. After further negotiations, the most important ships of the Black Sea Fleet in Tsemes Bay in front of Novorossiysk were sunk by their crews.

During World War II, the Black Sea Fleet of the Soviet Navy was able to fend off the first air attack by the Nazi German Luftwaffe. However, after the city defended itself for 250 days, Sevastopol fell to the Germans on 4 July 1942.

After the dissolution of the Soviet Union at the end of 1991, the former Soviet Navy came under jurisdiction of United Armed Forces of the Commonwealth of Independent States and later regulated by the separate treaty between the Russian Federation and Ukraine. After a failed attempt to annex Crimea in 1990s, in 1997 the Russian Federation signed the Partition Treaty on the Status and Conditions of the Black Sea Fleet with Ukraine which allowed the Russian-allocated ships to remain on Ukrainian territory until 2017 sharing the Sevastopol Bay along with ships of Ukrainian Navy. From then on, Russia paid an annual lease to Ukraine for the use of the base until 2014, as regulated by the Partition Treaty on the Black Sea Fleet and the Kharkiv Pact. Since the annexation of Crimea by the Russian Federation in 2014, the naval base is again under Russian control.

Gallery

See also 
 Port of Sevastopol
 Naval museum complex Balaklava, former submarine pen 10 km south of Sevastopol in Balaklava Bay
 Sevastopol Radar Station
 List of Russian military bases abroad

References

External links 

 Photos Black Fleet

Buildings and structures in Sevastopol
Military units and formations established in 1783
Military installations established in 1783
Naval Base
Sevastopol
Sevastopol
Sevastopol
Military history of Russia
Military history of Ukraine
Russia–Ukraine relations
Military installations of Russia in other countries